

Ottoman Empire
 Principality of Abkhazia – Arslan Begi (1806–1810)

Portugal
 Angola – António de Saldanha da Gama, Governor of Angola (1807–1810)
 Macau – Lucas Jose de Alvarenga, Governor of Macau (1808–1810)

Spanish Empire
Viceroyalty of New Granada – Antonio José Amar y Borbón Arguedas (1803–1810)
Viceroyalty of New Spain –
Pedro de Garibay (1808–1809)
Francisco Javier de Lizana y Beaumont (1809–1810)
Captaincy General of Cuba – Salvador José de Muro, 2nd Marquis of Someruelos, Governor of Cuba (1799–1812)
Captaincy General of Puerto Rico – Salvador Meléndez Bruna (es), Governor of Puerto Rico (1809–1812)
Spanish East Indies – Mariano Fernández de Folgueras, Governor-General of the Philippines (1806–1810)
Commandancy General of the Provincias Internas – Nemesio Salcedo y Salcedo (1802–1813)
Viceroyalty of Peru – José Fernando Abascal y Sousa, marqués de la Concordia (1806–1816)
Captaincy General of Chile – Francisco Antonio García Carrasco Díaz, Governor and Captain-General of Chile (1808–1810)
Viceroyalty of the Río de la Plata –
Santiago de Liniers, Viceroy of the Río de la Plata (1807–1809)
Baltasar Hidalgo de Cisneros, Viceroy of the Río de la Plata (1809–1810)

United Kingdom of Great Britain and Ireland|United Kingdom
 Cayman Islands – William Bodden, Chief Magistrate of the Cayman Islands (1776–1823)
 Malta Protectorate – Alexander Ball, Civil Commissioner of Malta (1802–1809)
 New South Wales –
William Bligh, de jure Governor of New South Wales (1806–1808), returned to England after the Rum Rebellion
John Macarthur and officers of the New South Wales Corps de facto rulers of the colony
Lachlan Macquarie, commissioned as Governor but did not arrive into the colony until 1810

Colonial governors
Colonial governors
1809